The O'Day 40 is an American sailboat that was designed by C. Raymond Hunt Associates and Philippe Briand as a cruiser and first built in 1986.

The boat is a development of the Sun Fizz 40, which was licensed by Jeanneau and developed into the O'Day 39 for production in the US. C. Raymond Hunt Associates then took Briand's design and further developed it into the O'Day 40, with the addition of a suger-scoop transom and a revised interior. Both Jeanneau and the O'Day Corp. were owned by US conglomerate Bangor Punta at the time.

Production
The design was built by O'Day Corp., a division of the Bangor Punta Corp., in the United States. It was built starting in 1986, with 180 boats completed and replaced the O'Day 39 in production.

Design
The O'Day 40 is a recreational keelboat, built predominantly of fiberglass, with wood trim. It has a masthead sloop rig, a raked stem, a step-down reverse transom with a small swimming platform, an internally mounted spade-type rudder controlled by a wheel and a fixed fin keel or optional shoal draft keel. The fin keel version displaces  and carries  of ballast, while the shoal draft version displaces .

Starting with serial number 135 the boats were delivered with a mast that was about  taller.

The boat is fitted with a Westerbeke  diesel engine for docking and maneuvering.

The boat has sleeping accommodation for up to seven people, with a double "V"-berth in the bow cabin, a large "U"-shaped settee around a drop-down table and a straight settee in the main cabin and an aft cabin on the starboard side with a double berth. The galley is located on the port side just forward of the companionway ladder. The galley has a "U"-shape and is equipped with a two-burner stove, an ice box and a double sink. A navigation station is opposite the galley, on the starboard side. The head is located just aft of the bow cabin on the port side and includes a shower.

See also
List of sailing boat types

Related development
O'Day 39
Sun Fizz 40

References

Keelboats
1980s sailboat type designs
Sailing yachts
Sailboat type designs by Philippe Briand
Sailboat type designs by C. Raymond Hunt Associates
Sailboat types built by O'Day Corp.